Asota tigrina is a moth of the family Erebidae first described by Arthur Gardiner Butler in 1882. It is found in Papua New Guinea.

References

Asota (moth)
Moths of New Guinea
Moths described in 1882